Friedrich (von) Spiegel (11 July 1820 in Kitzingen – 15 December 1905 in München) was a German orientalist. He was one of the pioneers in the field of Iranian philology.

Biography 
He was born in Kitzingen, studied at Erlangen, Leipzig, and Bonn, then spent five years in the libraries of Copenhagen, Paris, London, and Oxford, and from 1849 to 1890 was professor of oriental languages in the University of Erlangen. His early studies on Pali and the publication of the Kammavâkya (1841) and the Ancedota Palica (1845) did much for the knowledge of southern Buddhism. They were quickly followed by his researches on Zoroastrianism and the Avesta. The edition of the greater part of the extant Avesta, together with the Pahlavi translation (1853–58), was followed by a German version (1852–63), and supplemented by a commentary (1865–69). He published a number of Persian works, as well as grammars of the Old Persian and Old Bactrian languages. Then came the valuable linguistic and archaeological works, Die altpersischen Keilinschriften (1862), Erân (1863), Erânische Altertumskunde (1871–78), Vergleichende Grammatik der alterânischen Sprachen (1882), and Die arische Periode und ihre Zustände (1887).

Literary works 
 Kammavâkya (Bonn, 1841)
 Anecdota palica (Leipzig, 1845)
 Kommentar über das Avesta (Leipzig, 1865–69, 2 vols.)
 Grammatik der altbaktrischen Sprache (Leipzig, 1867)
 Chrestomathia persica (Leipzig, 1845)
 Grammatik der Pârsisprache (Leipzig, 1851)
 Einleitung in die traditionellen Schriften der Parsen (Leipzig, 1856–60, 2 vols.)
 Die altpersischen Keilinschriften im Grundtext, mit Übersetzung, Grammatik und Glossar (Leipzig, 1862, 2nd ed. 1881)
 Erân, das Land zwischen dem Indus und Tigris (Berlin, 1863)
 Arische Studien (Leipzig, 1873)
 Erânischen Altertumskunde (Leipzig, 1871–78, 3 vols.)
 Vergleichende Grammatik der alterânischen Sprachen (Leipzig, 1882)
 Die arische Periode und ihre Zustände (Leipzig, 1887)
 “Beiträgen zur vergleichenden Sprachforschung,” in Zeitschrift der deutschen morgenländischen Gesellschaft

References

External links

 
 

1820 births
1905 deaths
People from Kitzingen
Old Persian language
German orientalists
University of Bonn alumni
Translators from Old Persian
Translators from Avestan
19th-century translators
19th-century German writers
19th-century German male writers
German male non-fiction writers